Esther Adelina Cuesta Santana (born 23 June 1975) is an Ecuadorian politician and a member of the National Assembly and The Citizens' Revolution. Cuesta was an undocumented immigrant in the United States and currently represents the 800,000 Ecuadorian migrants in Europe, Asia, and Oceania.

Life
Cuesta was born in Guayaquil, Ecuador, in 1975. When she was 19, she vacationed in Mexico, secretly crossing the border into the United States. She was an undocumented immigrant for "several years". Cuesta earned graduate, masters, and doctoral degrees from the University of Massachusetts Amherst in 2002, 2009, and 2015, respectively. Her interests at the time were not political but in linguistics, economics, anthropology, and sociology. Cuesta's doctoral research involved studying migration to Europe from Ecuador.

In 2009, Cuesta went to Italy to research and, while she was there, was offered the position of Consul eventually becoming Ecuador's Consul General in Genoa. She was in that position until April 2015. She then joined the Ministry of Foreign Affairs as Vice Minister of Human Mobility and in 2016 she was promoted to be the Minister. She put herself forward as a candidate for the National Assembly and she was elected in February 2017 to represent the 800,000 Ecuadorian migrants in Europe, Asia, and Oceania. She was appointed to be the president of the Italian-Ecuadorian Parliamentary Group and vice president of the Assembly's Committee on Foreign Relations, Sovereignty and Security.

Cuesta was President of the Commission for Sovereignty, Integration, International Relations and Integral Security. She was elected by the National Assembly to that position in June 2018 with Ana Belen Marin as her vice-President.

Before the elections in February 2021, Cuesta requested unpaid leave from the assembly so that she could take part in the elections. 42 other members also made the same request including Wilma Andrade, Mónica Alemán, Verónica Arias, Dallyana Passailaigue, Cristina Reyes and Silvia Lorena Vera. During her absence her job would be carried out by her substitute.

In July 2022 the position of vice-president of the assembly was vacant as Yeseña Guamaní had been removed by the Union for Hope (UNES) faction and a replacement was required. There was a political stand-off as the parties could not agree. The Pachakutik party proposed Mireya Pazmiño and Mario Ruiz and the Democratic Left offered Johanna Moreira. UNES offered Marcela Holguín, Sofia Espín and Cuesta.

References

1975 births
Living people
21st-century Ecuadorian politicians
21st-century Ecuadorian women politicians
Members of the National Assembly (Ecuador)
University of Massachusetts Amherst alumni
Women members of the National Assembly (Ecuador)